Reginaldo Michá Ndong Mangue (born October 14, 1986) is an Equatoguinean track and field sprint athlete who competes internationally for his country.

Ndong represented Equatorial Guinea at the 2008 Summer Olympics in Beijing. He competed at the 100 metres sprint and placed 8th in his heat without advancing to the second round. He ran the distance in a time of 11.61 seconds.

References

External links
Reginaldo Ndong profile on Facebook

1986 births
Living people
Equatoguinean male sprinters
Olympic athletes of Equatorial Guinea
Athletes (track and field) at the 2008 Summer Olympics